Thomas Abernethy may refer to 
 Thomas Abernethy (explorer) (1803–1860), Scottish seafarer, gunner in the Royal Navy, and polar explorer
 Thomas Perkins Abernethy (1890–1975), American historian of early American history
 Thomas Abernethy (politician) (1903–1998), American politician
 Tom Abernethy (born 1954), American professional basketball player

See also
Abernethy (surname)